The following is a list of the notable Regimental Marches for military regiments of the British Army. In addition, all regiments have additional pieces for slow marches, marches for mounted parades and pipe marches.

Units in 1940

Regular Army
Life Guards  :-    -					Milanollo

Royal Horse Guards  :-    -					Aida,  Duchess of Kent

1st King's Dragoon Guards  :-    -				The Radetsky March

Queen's Bays (2nd Dragoon Guards)  :-    -			Rusty Buckles

3rd Carabiniers (Prince of Wales's Dragoon Guards)  :-    -	Carabinier's March

4th/7th Royal Dragoon Guards  :-    -			St Patrick's Day (former 4th Dragoon Guards had been the Royal Irish)

5th Royal Inniskilling Dragoon Guards  :-    -	Soldier's chorus (Faust), Sprig of Shillelagh

1st Royal Dragoons  :-    -					1st Dragoons, Soldier's chorus (Faust),

Scots Greys (2nd Dragoons):-    -				Walk: The Garb of Old Gaul
-    -				Trot: The Keel Row
-    -				Canter: Bonnie Dundee
-    -				Dismounted: Highland Laddie

3rd The King's Own Hussars  :-    -					(Quick) Robert the Devil

-    -	 (slow) The 3rd Hussars
4th Queen's Own Hussars  :-    -				Quick: Berkeley's Dragoons
-    -		                                                Slow: Litany of Loretto
7th Queen's Own Hussars  :-    -				The Bannocks Of Barley Meal

8th King's Royal Irish Hussars  :-    -				The Galloping 8th Hussar

9th Queen's Royal Lancers  :-    -				Men of Harlech

10th Royal Hussars  :-    -					The Merry Month Of May

11th Hussars (Prince Albert's Own)  :-    -			Moses in Egypt
12th Royal Lancers (Prince of Wales's)  :-    -				Coburg March

13th/18th Royal Hussars (Queen Mary's Own)  :-    -		none

14th/20th Hussars  :-    -					none

15th/19th The King's Royal Hussars  :-    -				Elliot's Light Horse

16th/5th The Queen's Royal Lancers  :-    -						St Patrick's Day (former 5th Lancers had been Royal Irish)

17th/21st Lancers  :-    -						White Lancers

Royal Tank Regiment  :-    -						My Boy Willie

Royal Artillery  :-    -					British Grenadiers, Keel Row, Bonnie Dundee

Royal Engineers  :-    -						British Grenadiers,  Wings

Royal Corps of Signals  :-  -                                           Begone Dull Care

Grenadier Guards  :-    - Slow: Scipio					Quick:	British Grenadiers

Coldstream Guards  :-    -	Slow: Figaro					Quick: Milanollo

Scots Guards:-    -							Quick: Highland Laddie
-    -							Slow: Garb of Old Gaul

Irish Guards  :-    - Slow:Let Erin Remember							Quick: St Patrick's Day	

Welsh Guards  :-    - Slow:	Men of Harlech,                                                         Quick: Rising of the Lark

Royal Scots (Royal Regiment):-    -					Quick: Dumbarton's Drums
-    -					Slow: Garb of Old Gaul
-    -					When Royalty present: The Daughter of the Regiment (commemorating the birth of Queen Victoria, daughter of the regimental colonel, Prince Edward, Duke of Kent and Strathearn)

Queen's Royal Regiment (West Surrey)  :-    -			We'll gang nae mair to yon toun, Braganza	

The Buffs (Royal East Kent Regiment)  :-    -			The Buffs

King's Own Royal Regiment (Lancaster)  :-    -			Corn Riggs are Bonny, Shall Trelawny Die?

Royal Northumberland Fusiliers  :-    -					British Grenadiers

Royal Warwickshire Regiment  :-    -					Warwickshire Lads

Royal Fusiliers (City of London Regiment)  :-    -			British Grenadiers, 7th Royal Fusiliers

King's Regiment (Liverpool)  :-    -					Here's to the Maiden of Bashful Fifteen

Royal Norfolk Regiment  :-    -					Rule Britannia

Lincolnshire Regiment  :-    -						Lincolnshire Poacher	

Devonshire Regiment  :-    -						We've Lived & Loved Together, Widdicombe Fair

Suffolk Regiment  :-    -							Speed the Plough

Somerset Light Infantry	(Prince Albert's)  :-    -			Prince Albert's March	

West Yorkshire Regiment (Prince of Wales's Own)  :-    -			Ça Ira

East Yorkshire Regiment  :-    -						Yorkshire Lass

Bedfordshire and Hertfordshire Regiment  :-    -				Mountain Rose, Mandolinata

Leicestershire Regiment  :-    -						Romaika, A Hunting Call

Green Howards (Alexandra PoW's Own Yorkshire)  :-    -		Bonnie English Rose	

Lancashire Fusiliers  :-    - The Minden March

Royal Scots Fusiliers:-    -						Band: British Grenadiers
-    -						Pipes: Highland Laddie

Cheshire Regiment  :-    -						Wha wadna fetch for Charlie?

Royal Welch Fusiliers  :-    -						British Grenadiers,  Men of Harlech

South Wales Borderers  :-    -						Men of Harlech

King's Own Scottish Borderers:-    -					Blue Bonnets O'er the Border

Cameronians (Scottish Rifles):-  -				Band: Within a mile of Edinboro's Town
-  -				Pipes: 1st Bn: Kenmuir's On An' Awa'
-  -				2nd Bn: The Gathering of the Grahams

Royal Inniskilling Fusiliers  :-    -					British Grenadiers, Sprig of Shilelagh

Gloucestershire Regiment  :-    -					Kynegad Slashers, Highland Piper

Worcestershire Regiment  :-    -						Royal Windsor

East Lancashire Regiment  :-    -						Lancashire Lads, The Attack

East Surrey Regiment  :-    -					Quick: A Southerly Wind and a Cloudy Sky

-  -                           Slow: Lord Charles Montague's The Huntingdonshire March
Duke of Cornwall's Light Infantry  :-    -				One and All/Trelawny

Duke of Wellington's Regiment (West Riding)  :-    -				The Wellesley

Border Regiment  :-    -						John Peel

Royal Sussex Regiment  :-    -						The Royal Sussex

Hampshire Regiment  :-    -							The Hampshires, Highland Piper

South Staffordshire Regiment  :-    -					Come Lassies & Lads	

Dorsetshire Regiment  :-    -						The Dorsetshires

Prince of Wales's Volunteers (South Lancashire Regiment)  :-    -		South Lancashires, God Bless the Prince of Wales

Welch Regiment  :-    -							Ap Shenkin

Black Watch (Royal Highland Regiment):-    -			Blue Bonnets over the Border, Highland Laddie

Oxfordshire & Buckinghamshire Light Infantry  :-    -			Nachtlager in Grenada, Lower Castle Yard

Essex Regiment  :-    -							The Essex, Highland Piper

Sherwood Foresters  :-    -		Young May Moon

Loyal Regiment (North Lancashire)  :-    -				The Red Rose

Northamptonshire Regiment  :-    -						The Northamptonshires

Royal Berkshire (Princess Charlotte of Wales) :-    -			Dashing White Sergeant

Queen's Own Royal West Kent Regiment  :-    -				A Hundred Pipers

King's Own Yorkshire Light Infantry  :-    -			Jockey of York, Jockey to the Fair

King's Shropshire Light Infantry  :-    -				Old Towler

Middlesex Regiment (Duke of Cambridge's Own)  :-    -		Lass o' Gowrie, Sir Manley Power

King's Royal Rifle Corps  :-    -					Huntesman's Chorus, Lutzow's Wild Hunt

Wiltshire Regiment (Duke of Edinburgh's  :-    -				The Wiltshires, The Fly be on the turmits

Manchester Regiment  :-    -						The Manchesters

North Staffordshire Regiment (Prince of Wales's)  :-    -				The Days We went Gypsying

York and Lancaster Regiment  :-    - ?

Durham Light Infantry  :-    -						Light Barque, Old 69th, Keel Row

Highland Light Infantry (City of Glasgow Regt):-    -  Whistle o'er the lave o't,
-    -  Column: Blue Bonnets over the Border
-    -  Close column: Highland Laddie
-    -  Marching into barracks: Scotland the Brave

Seaforth Highlanders (Ross-shire Buffs, Duke of Albany's)  :-    -		Highland Laddie
-    -		Band: Blue Bonnets O'er the Border
-    -		Pipes: Pibroch O' Donail Dhu

Gordon Highlanders:-    -						Cock o' the North
-    -						Until 1932: Highland Laddie

Queen's Own Cameron Highlanders  :-    -				Pibroch o' Donald Dhu, March of the Cameron Men

Royal Ulster Rifles  :-    -						Off, off, said the Stranger

Royal Irish Fusiliers  :-    -						British Grenadiers
-    -				combination of 			Barrosa, Garry Owen, Norah Creing, St Patrick's Day

Argyll & Sutherland Highlanders (Princess Louise's):-    -		1st Bn The Campbells are Coming
-    -		2nd Bn: Highland Laddie

Rifle Brigade  :-    -							I'm Ninety Five

Royal Army Service Corps  :-    -					Wait for the Wagon

Royal Army Medical Corps  :-    -					Bonny Nell

Royal Army Ordnance Corps  :-    -				Village Blacksmith

Royal Army Pay Corps  :-    -					Imperial Echoes

Royal Army Veterinary Corps  :-    -					Village Blacksmith

Army Dental Corps  :-    -						none

Royal Electrical & Mechanical Engineers          - Lili Burlero

Territorial Army
Ayrshire (Earl of Carrick's Own) Yeomanry:-    -					 Garb of Old Gaul

Fife and Forfar Yeomanry:-    -					 Wee Cooper o' Fife

Lovat Scouts:-    -					 The Lovat Scouts

Scottish Horse:-    -					 The Scottish Horse

7th (City of London) Battalion London Regiment:-    -					My Lady Greensleeves

London Scottish:-    -					 Highland Laddie

Liverpool Scottish:-    -					 Glendauruel Highlanders

1st Surrey Rifles-    -					Lutzow's Wild Hunt

Tyneside Scottish:-    -					 Highland Laddie

Units in 2008

 1st The Queen's Dragoon Guards - Radetsky & Rusty Buckles;
 Royal Dragoon Guards - St Patrick's Day
 6th Queen Elizabeth's Own Gurkha Rifles - Young May Moon;
 9th/12th Royal Lancers - God Bless the Prince of Wales;
 13th/18th Royal Hussars (Queen Mary's Own) - A Life on the Ocean Wave and Balaklava March;
 l4th/20th King's Hussars - Royal Sussex;
 15th/19th king's Royal Hussars - The Bold King's Hussars;
 16th/5th Queen's royal Lancers - Stable Jacket;
 15th Princess Mary's own Gurkha Rifles - Hundred Pipers;
 17th/21st Lancers - The White Lancers;
 22nd (Cheshire) regiment - Wha Wadna Fecht for Charlie;
 Adjutant General's corps - Pride of Lions;
 Allied Rapid Reaction Corps - Fortune Favours the Bold;
 Argyll and Sutherland Highlanders (Princess Louise's) - The Thin Red Line;
 Army Air Corps - Recce Flight;
 Army Benevolent Fund - Action Support; SSAFA - The SSAFA Concert March;
 Army Catering corps - Sugar and Spice;
 Army Legal Corps - Scales of Justice;
 Army Physical Training Corps - Be Fit;
 Black Watch (Royal Highland Regiment) - Highland Laddie;
 Blues and Royals - Grand March from Aida & The Royals;
 Brigade of Gurkhas - Yo Nepali;
 British Korean Veterans' Association - The Hills of Korea;
 Burma Star Association - On The Road To Mandalay;
 Central flying School - Those Magnificent Men In Their Flying Machines;
 Civil Admin (MOD) - Soldiers First;
 St Dunstans - St Dunstans;
 Coldstream Guards - Milanollo;
 Corps of Royal electrical and Mechanical Engineers - Lillibullero;
 Corps of Royal Engineers - Wings;
 Corps of Royal Military Police - The Watch Tower;
 Corps of Army Music/RMSM - Blow Away the Morning Dew
 Devonshire and Dorset Regiment - Widecombe Fair, We've Lived and Loved Together and The Maid of Glenconnel;
 Duke of Edinburgh's Royal Regiment - The Farmer's Boy;
 Duke of Wellington's Regiment (West Riding) - The Wellesley;
 Duke of Edinburgh's Own Gurkha Rifles - Old Monmouthshire;
 Dunkirk Veterans Association - Dunkirk Veterans March;
 Fleet Air Arm - Flying Stations;
 Gloucestershire Regiment - The Kinnegad Slashers;
 Gordon Highlanders - Cock o' the North; 2nd
 Green Howards - Bonnie English Rose;
 Grenadier Guards - British Grenadiers;
 Gurkha Signals - Scotland the Brave;
 Special air Service - Marche Des Parachutistes Belges;
 Gurkha Transport Regiment - Wait for the Wagon;
 Gurkha Engineers - Wings;
 Gurkha Military Police - The Watch Tower;
 Highlanders - The Queen's Own Highlanders & Cock o' the North;
 Intelligence corps - The Rose and the Laurel;
 Irish Guards - St Patrick's Day;
 King Edward VII's Own Gurkha Rifles - Lutzow's Wild Hunt;
 King's Own Scottish Borderers - Blue Bonnets Over the Border;
 King's Division - Bond of Friendship;
 King's Royal Hussars - The King's Royal Hussars;
 King's Regiment - The Kingsman;
 King's Own Border Regiment - John Peel & Corn Rigs are Bonnie;
 Life Guards - Milanollo;
 Light Division - The Light Division;
 Light Infantry - Light Infantry;
 Military Provost Staff Corps - The Metropolitan;
 Normandy Veterans' Association - Normandy Veterans;
 Parachute Regiment - Ride of the Valkyries; 7th
 Prince of Wales' Division - God Bless the Prince of Wales;
 Prince of Wales's Own Regiment of Yorkshire - Ca Ira and The Yorkshire Lass;
 Princess of Wales's Royal Regiment - The Farmer's Boy/The Soldiers of the Queen;
 Queen Alexandra's Royal Army Nursing Corps - Gray and Scarlet;
 Queen Alexandra's Royal Naval Nursing Service - QARNNS March;
 Queen's Royal Irish Hussars - St Patrick's Day, Berkeley's Dragoons and The Galloping 8th Hussars;
 Queen's Regiment - Soldiers of the Queen;
 Queen's division - The Queensman;
 Queen's Royal Hussars - The Queen's Royal Hussars;
 Queen's Own Hussars - Light Cavalry;
 Queen's Royal lancers - Scarlet and Green;
 Queen's Own Highlanders - Scotland for Ever & Cameron Men;
 Queen's Lancashire Regiment - The Attack & The Red Rose;
 Reconnaissance Corps - Away To The Mountain's Brow;
 Royal Air Force - Royal Air Force March Past
 Royal Air Force Association - RAF Association March;
 Royal Air Force Nursing Service - Skywards;
 Royal Air Force Police - Royal Air Force Police March Past
 Royal Air Force Regiment - Holyrood
 Royal Anglian Regiment - Rule Britannia & Speed the Plough;
 Royal Army Chaplain's Department - Trumpet Voluntary;
 Royal Army Education Corps - Gaudeamus Igitur & The Good Comrade;
 Royal Army Medical Corps - Here's a Health unto His Majesty;
 Royal Army Ordnance Corps - The Village Blacksmith
 Royal Army Pay Corps - Imperial Echoes;
 Royal Army Veterinary Corps - Drink Puppy Drink & A Hunting We Will Go;
 Royal British Legion - The British Legion;
 Royal Corps of Signals - Swift and Sure; Begone Dull Care; The Signaller.
 Royal Corps of Transport - Wait for the Wagon;
 Royal Army Dental Corps - Green Facings;
 Royal Gloucestershire, Berkshire and Wiltshire Regiment - The Sphinx and Dragon;
 Royal GreenJackets - Huntsman's Chorus & The Italian Song;
 Royal Hampshire Regiment - The Hampshire;
 Royal Highland Fusiliers (Princess Margaret's Own Glasgow and Ayreshire Regiment) - Whistle o'er the Lave O't and British Grenadiers:
 Royal Hospital Chelsea - Boys of the Old Brigade
 Royal Hussars (Prince of Wales's Own) - The Merry Month of May;
 Royal Irish Rangers - Killaloe;
 Royal Logistic Corps - On Parade;		
 Royal Marines - A Life on the Ocean Wave;
 Royal Marine Commandos - Sarie Marais;
 Royal Navy - Heart of Oak;
 Royal Naval Association - Under the White Ensign
 Royal Observer Corps - Skywatch;
 Royal Pioneer Corps - Pioneer Corps;
 Royal Regiment of Artillery - British Grenadiers & Voice of the Guns;
 Royal Regiment of Fusiliers - New Fusilier;  The British Grenadiers
 Royal Regiment of Wales - Men of Harlech;
 Royal Scots - Dumbarton's Drums;
 Royal Scots Dragoon Guards - 3DG's;
 5th Royal Inniskilling Guards - Fare ye Well Inniskilling;
 Royal Star and Garter Home - The Royal Star and Garter;
 Royal Tank Regiment - My Boy Willie;
 Royal Welch Fusiliers - The British Grenadiers;
 Scots Guards - Heilan' Laddie;
 Small Arms School Corps - March of the Bowmen;
 Staffordshire Regiment (The Prince of Wales's) - Come Lasses and Lads and The Days We went A-Gipsying;
 Strike Command - Strike Command March Past;
 Sub mariners - Up Periscope;
 Ulster Defence Regiment - Sprig of Shillelagh & Garryowen;
 Welsh Guards - Rising of the Lark;
 Women's Royal Army Corps - Lass of Richmond Hill & Early One Morning;
 Women's Royal Naval Service - Passing By;
 Women's Royal Voluntary Service - The WRVS March.
 Worcestershire and Sherwood Foresters Regiment - Young May Moon & The Royal Windsor;

Notes

References

 Anon, A War Record of the 21st London Regiment (First Surrey Rifles), 1914–1919, 1927/Uckfield: Naval & Military, 2003, .
 Maj R. Money Barnes, The Uniforms and History of the Scottish Regiments, London: Seeley Service, 1956/Sphere 1972.
 C. Digby Planck, The Shiny Seventh: History of the 7th (City of London) Battalion London Regiment, London: Old Comrades' Association, 1946/Uckfield: Naval & Military Press, 2002, .
 Band of the Royal Corps of Signals. Quick Marches of the British Armed Forces – audio recordings in four volumes

Regimental marches
British Army lists
British military marches